I’ll Sleep When I’m Dead (An Anthology) is a two-disc compilation album by American singer-songwriter Warren Zevon, released on Rhino Records in 1996.  It spans his career from his eponymous debut album on Asylum Records to date of release, ignoring his disowned initial album from 1969, Wanted Dead or Alive. It contains tracks from all ten of his albums released during this period, and includes contributions to soundtracks and his one-off album with members of R.E.M., Hindu Love Gods.

Disc one collects recordings done for Asylum, and disc two collects recordings done for Virgin and Giant Records.

Track listing

Disc one

Disc two

Collective personnel
Warren Zevon – vocals, piano, organ, synthesizer, keyboards, guitars, harmonicapercussion
David Lindley – banjo, fiddle, guitars, slide-guitar, lap steel guitar, saz
Glenn Frey, Cain Sharp, Waddy Wachtel, Neil Young, Zeke Zirngiebel – guitars, backing vocals
Peter Buck, Mike Campbell, Denny Dias, David Gilmour, David Landau, Steve Lukather, Peter Maunu – guitars
Darius Degher – sitar
Bob Harris – keyboards, backing vocals
Chick Corea, Lois Griffin, Roy Bittan – piano
Benmont Tench – organ
Jai Winding – piano, keyboards, backing vocals
Bob Glaub – bass guitar, keyboards
Jorge Calderon, Kenny Edwards, Roberto Pinon – bass, backing vocals
Skittles Cat, Larry Klein, Tony Levin, LeRoy Marinell, John McVie, Mike Mills, Leland Sklar – bass
Bill Berry, Stanley Cat, Mick Fleetwood, Richie Hayward, Jim Keltner, Danny Kortchmar, Craig Krampf, Russ Kunkel, Gary Mallaber, Rick Marotta, Jeff Porcaro, Marty Stinger, Kurt Wortman, Larry Zack – drums, percussion
Karla Bonoff, Jackson Browne, Lindsey Buckingham, Rosemary Butler, Darcy DeMoss, Phil Everly, Don Henley, Billy Hinsche, Kipp Lennon, Mark Lennon, Michael Lennon, Stan Lynch, Belinda Montgomery, Graham Nash, Patricia Richardson, Linda Ronstadt, J.D. Souther, Michael Stipe, Jennifer Warnes, Jordan Zevon – backing vocals
Charles Veal, Ken Yerke – violins
Carole Mukogawa – viola
Dennis Karmazyn – cello
Mark Isham – trumpet, electronic sounds
Jim Horn – saxophones, recorder
Bobby Keys – saxophones
Bruce Hornsby – accordion
Fritz Richmond – jug

Production
Gary Peterson, Mark Pinkus – compilation producers
Warren Zevon, Duncan Aldrich, Niko Bolas, Jackson Browne, Bill Inglot, Mark Isham, Greg Ladanyi, Andrew Slater, Waddy Wachtel – original recordings producers
Duncan Aldrich, Niko Bolas, Richard Bosworth, Marc DeSisto, Dennis Kirk, Steve Krause, Nathaniel Kunkel, Greg Ladanyi, Richard Landers, Peggy McAfee, Kent Nebergall, Jim Nipar, Fritz Richmond, Rail Jon Rogut, Bob Vogt, Billy Youdelman – engineers
Duncan Aldrich, Niko Bolas, John Haeny, Rob Jacobs, Rob Jaczko, John Beverly Jones, Dennis Kirk, Greg Ladanyi, Shelly Yakus – mixing engineers
Bill Inglot, Geoff Sykes – remastering engineers
Carl Wilson – vocal arrangements on "Desperados Under the Eaves"
Monster X, Coco Shinomiya – art direction and design
Duncan Aldrich, Roger Bell, Gloria Boyce, Henry Diltz, Jonathan Exley, George Gruel, Michael Ochs, Aaron Rapoport, Randee Saint Nicholas, Jon Sievert, Lorrie Sullivan, Scott Weiner, Serenus Zeitblom, Crystal Zevon – photography
Joey Helguera – tape research

References

Warren Zevon compilation albums
1996 compilation albums
Albums produced by Greg Ladanyi
Rhino Records compilation albums